Woolbrook is a village in the New England region of New South Wales, Australia. The nearest town, Walcha is 29 km to the east of Woolbrook.

The village straddles the Macdonald River which is in the headwater of the Namoi River.  Woolbrook village is located in Tamworth Regional Council local government area, it is close to the Oxley Highway a few kilometres east of the junction between the Oxley Highway and the New England Highway. Other parts of the Woolbrook area are within the Walcha Shire local government area.

History
In 1836 Robert Rodd settled on the land known as Surveyor's Creek Run an area of  that then covered the area of the future villages of Woolbrook and Walcha Road. Amos Brothers erected the MacDonald River Private Hospital in 1879 to tend the men employed during the railway construction. The railway from Sydney to Woolbrook and onto Uralla was completed in 1882. Norm, Don and Geoff Goodwin, started the Goodwin Brothers sawmill there in c.1950. It was sold several times after Don died and finally closed in 2004. Macdonald River Post Office opened on 1 December 1889 and was renamed Woolbrook in 1891 and closed in 1990. A bakery was in operation at Woolbrook until around 1998.

A Weather Bureau site was opened in 1958 and is now monitored by the Watson family. Remaining is a public school with about 20 pupils, a store, the AIF Memorial Hall and St John's church which was built in 1929. The main industry in the area is sheep and beef cattle breeding. The population is now 220 persons, usually resident in the Woolbrook area.

On 28 and 29 November 2008, Woolbrook received torrential rain that caused severe flooding in the Macdonald River and led to the area being declared a natural disaster area.

Woolbrook hosts the annual Woolbrook Stampede each Easter. The horse sports include campdrafting, plus other sporting and novelty events. Woolbrook Spring Fair is held in October with draught horse events, goat racing, dog trials and other entertainment. The Macdonald River is a popular swimming and fishing spot and there are picnic facilities.

Climate
Woolbrook has the typical cool winter, mild to warm summer climate of the Northern Tablelands. Although due to the towns location in a deep valley, it records some of the coldest temperatures in the region, and sometimes even in the whole of Australia during the winter months. Woolbrook is fairly sunny, recording 118 clear days on a yearly basis. On 19 June 1994, a temperature of −14.5 °C (5.9 °F) was recorded in the town, the coldest temperature observed anywhere in Australia outside of the Australian Alps.

Notable people from Woolbrook
 Barnaby Joyce, an Australian politician, grew up at Woolbrook and attended the school there until he was 11.

Heritage listings
The heritage-listed sites in Woolbrook are:
 Woolbrook rail bridge over Macdonald River

Woolbrook railway station

Woolbrook station was opened on 2 August 1882 as Macdonald River. On 30 October 1891 it was renamed Woolbrook and closed at an unknown date in the late 1990s/2000s. The nearest current station is Walcha Road.

References

External links

 Inscription List for Woolbrook General Cemetery

Towns in New South Wales
Towns in New England (New South Wales)
Walcha Shire
Tamworth Regional Council
Railway stations opened in 1882